Saltirka Spasova-Tarpova (born 22 July 1933) is a Bulgarian gymnast. She competed at the 1952 Summer Olympics, the 1956 Summer Olympics and the 1960 Summer Olympics.

See also
 List of female artistic gymnasts with the most appearances at Olympic Games

References

External links
 

1933 births
Living people
Bulgarian female artistic gymnasts
Olympic gymnasts of Bulgaria
Gymnasts at the 1952 Summer Olympics
Gymnasts at the 1956 Summer Olympics
Gymnasts at the 1960 Summer Olympics
People from Pleven Province
20th-century Bulgarian women